Hanseniaspora is a genus of yeasts. The name Kloeckera is applied to its anamorph form. They are typically apiculate (lemon-shaped) in shape and often found in grape musts pre-fermentation.

The genus name Hanseniaspora honours Emil Christian Hansen (1842–1909), who was a Danish mycologist and fermentation physiologist. It was initially circumscribed by H. Zikes in 1911, but not validly published. Albert Klöcker published the name validly the following year.

The genus is notable for its loss of many highly conserved genes responsible for cell cycle regulation and genome integrity, resulting in increased evolution rates and genome size reduction. It can be divided into two lineages: a faster-evolving lineage (FEL) diversifying about 87 mya, and a slower one diversifying about 52 mya. The FEL has more of such gene losses, resulting in more dramatic changes in the genome and inactivation of multiple metabolic pathways. However, it has managed to diversity and thrive, showing that life can function without such regulation.

Species
Hanseniaspora clermontiae 
Hanseniaspora gamundiae 
Hanseniaspora guilliermondii 
Hanseniaspora lachancei 
Hanseniaspora meyeri 
Hanseniaspora occidentalis 
Hanseniaspora opuntiae 
Hanseniaspora osmophila 
Hanseniaspora pseudoguilliermondii 
Hanseniaspora uvarum 
Hanseniaspora valbyensis 
Hanseniaspora vineae

See also
Yeast in winemaking

References

Saccharomycetes
Ascomycota genera
Yeasts
Yeasts used in brewing
Taxa described in 1912